Scutchalo Creek is a stream in the U.S. state of Mississippi.

The name "Scutchalo" may be derived from an unidentified Native American language, but its meaning is obscure.

References

Rivers of Mississippi
Rivers of Copiah County, Mississippi
Rivers of Hinds County, Mississippi
Mississippi placenames of Native American origin